Lance Tait is an American playwright, screenwriter, filmmaker and composer. Tait has written over forty full length and one act plays, including seventeen plays based on short stories of Edgar Allan Poe. He has also published two books of comedy sketches. He is also active as a filmmaker, best known for the viral YouTube hit Sex in Advertising. In 2002, Tait founded the English-language performing arts group Theatre Metropole in Paris, France.

Works for the stage 

 The Babysitter (1995)
 Something Special, Jesus and the Monkfish, and East Play (1997) 
 David Mamet Fan Club and Behave My Sorrow (1998)
 Miss Julie, after August Strindberg (1999)
 Live Free or Die (1999)
 Edwin Booth (2000)
 Dmitri, Read to Me, Betsy Philadelphia, A Family Portrait, Mad Cow Disease in America, The Swimming Pools of Paris and The Glass Ceiling (2001) 
 The Fall of the House of Usher, The Imp of the Perverse, Some Words with a Mummy, The Oval Portrait, and Landor's Cottage Revisited (2002)
 Never Let Them See You Sweat and Conquests (2002)
 Spectacles, Hop-Frog, The Man of the Crowd, The Power of Words, and The Man That Was Used Up (2003)
 Synesthesia (2003) 
 Helen, a musical (2004)
 Comedy Sketches I (2005)
 The Facts in the Case of M. Valdemar, Memories of August Bedloe, A Predicament and The Lovers  (2005)
 Comedy Sketches II (2006)
 Neither God Nor Master (2006)
 Comedy Sketches III (2007)
 Comedy Sketches IV (2009)
 Car Door Shave (2011)
 The Black Cat (2011) 
 Gambling Fever (2012)
 Comedy Sketches V (2013)
 The Cask of Amontillado and The Purloined Letter (2013)
 Comedy Sketches VI (2014)

Bibliography 

 The Black Cat and Other Plays, Adapted from Stories by Edgar Allan Poe
 Car Door Shave/Gambling Fever/Neither God Nor Master
 Little White Book of Comedy Sketches
 Little Black Book of Comedy Sketches
 Synesthesia
 Esoteric Plays
 Something Special
 The Swimming Pools of Paris
 The Fall of the House of Usher and Other Plays Inspired by Edgar Allan Poe
 Mad Cow Disease In America, Something Special and Other Plays
 Edwin Booth: a Play in Two Acts
 Miss Julie, David Mamet Fan Club and Other Plays

References

External links 
 Official Site
 Theatre Metropole
 Youtube Channel for Theatre Metropole

21st-century American dramatists and playwrights
Living people
Year of birth missing (living people)
20th-century American dramatists and playwrights
American male dramatists and playwrights
21st-century American male writers
20th-century American male writers